Bison is a city in Rush County, Kansas, United States.  As of the 2020 census, the population of the city was 179.

History
The community was platted in 1888 by the Missouri Pacific Railroad. It was named for the American bison, which once grazed there.

The first post office in Bison was established in May 1888.

Geography
Bison is located at  (38.520718, -99.197528).

Climate
The climate in this area is characterized by hot, humid summers and generally mild to cool winters.  According to the Köppen Climate Classification system, Bison has a humid subtropical climate, abbreviated "Cfa" on climate maps.

Demographics

2010 census
As of the census of 2010, there were 255 people, 104 households, and 72 families residing in the city. The racial makeup of the city was 97.6% White, 0.8% Native American, 0.4% from other races, and 1.2% from two or more races. Hispanic or Latino of any race were 0.4% of the population.

There were 104 households, of which 31.7% had children under the age of 18 living with them, 58.7% were married couples living together, 6.7% had a female householder with no husband present, 3.8% had a male householder with no wife present, and 30.8% were non-families. 20.2% of all households were made up of individuals, and 6.7% had someone living alone who was 65 years of age or older. The average household size was 2.45 and the average family size was 2.85.

The median age in the city was 40.9 years. 23.5% of residents were under the age of 18; 9.8% were between the ages of 18 and 24; 20.8% were from 25 to 44; 34.5% were from 45 to 64; and 11.4% were 65 years of age or older. The gender makeup of the city was 48.2% male and 51.8% female.

2000 census
As of the census of 2000, there were 235 people, 97 households, and 70 families residing in the city. The racial makeup of the city was 94.89% White, 3.40% African American, 1.28% Native American, and 0.43% from two or more races. Hispanic or Latino of any race were 0.43% of the population.

There were 97 households, out of which 29.9% had children under the age of 18 living with them, 62.9% were married couples living together, 6.2% had a female householder with no husband present, and 27.8% were non-families. 27.8% of all households were made up of individuals, and 15.5% had someone living alone who was 65 years of age or older. The average household size was 2.42 and the average family size was 2.96.

In the city, the population was spread out, with 28.5% under the age of 18, 3.4% from 18 to 24, 27.2% from 25 to 44, 20.9% from 45 to 64, and 20.0% who were 65 years of age or older. The median age was 40 years. For every 100 females, there were 88.0 males. For every 100 females age 18 and over, there were 84.6 males.

The median income for a household in the city was $33,333, and the median income for a family was $37,813. Males had a median income of $28,125 versus $22,708 for females. The per capita income for the city was $23,122. About 6.2% of families and 5.3% of the population were below the poverty line, including none of those under the age of eighteen and 12.8% of those 65 or over.

Education
The community is served by Otis–Bison USD 403 public school district.  School unification consolidated Bison and Otis schools forming USD 403. The Otis-Bison High School mascot is Cougars.

Bison schools were closed through school unification. The Bison High School mascot was Buffaloes.

References

Further reading

External links
 Bison - Directory of Public Officials
 USD 403, local school district
 History of Cities in Rush County
 Bison Info, Legends of Kansas
 Rush County map, KDOT

Cities in Kansas
Cities in Rush County, Kansas